Michael Xavier Voon (MXV; born in Ipoh, Perak) is a multi-faceted art practitioner based in Kuala Lumpur, Malaysia. He is known for directing, coaching and choreographing for TV and stage such as Malaysian Idol, One in a Million, So You Think You Can Dance, Dreamgirls, Shout! The Mod Musical, HipHopera the Musical, Realiti (8TV) and trained Jaclyn Victor (the first Malaysian Idol and first Ikon Malaysia, Faizal Tahir, Dina, Dayang and Daniel Lee.

Voon burst onto the dance scene in the early 90s, after having received his training in the United States. He borrowed techniques from Eastern, Western and other cultures to create new multicultural expressions.

References

1964 births
Living people
People from Perak
Malaysian Christians
One in a Million (Malaysian TV series)
Malaysian Idol